Colours. Reflect. Time. Loss. is the fourth studio album by English electronic musician Maps. It was released on 10 May 2019 through Mute Records. The album was recorded live with other vocalists, drummers and the classical ensemble Echo Collective.

Critical reception
Colours. Reflect. Time. Loss. was met with generally favourable reviews from critics. At Metacritic, which assigns a weighted average rating out of 100 to reviews from mainstream publications, this release received an average score of 80, based on 5 reviews.

Track listing

Charts

References

2019 albums
Maps (musician) albums
Mute Records albums